The 2001–02 North Carolina Tar Heels men's basketball team represented the University of North Carolina at Chapel Hill during the 2001–02 NCAA Division I men's basketball season. Their head coach was Matt Doherty. The team captains for this season were Jason Capel and Kris Lang.  The team played its home games in the Dean Smith Center in Chapel Hill, North Carolina as a member of the Atlantic Coast Conference.

Roster

Fingleton only played one game, against Davidson, before announcing he would transfer at the end of 2001.  He later transferred to Holy Cross.

Schedule and results

The Tar Heels started their regular season with three losses, the first time they had done so in 73 years.  Their first regular season and conference win over Georgia Tech avoided the program's first 0-4 start in its history.

The Tar Heels were ranked number 19 in that season's preseason AP Poll.  They fell out of the AP Poll after losing to Hampton. It would be the Tar Heels' only AP Poll ranking that season.

The 2001-02 season was also the first season the Tar Heels did not make it to the championship game of the Tournament of Champions presented by Hardee's in ten years, falling to Charleston in the second game.  The Tar Heels did manage to upset Saint Joseph's, then ranked number 15 in the AP Poll, in the consolation game.

Prior to 2002, the largest margin of defeat against the Tar Heels in the Dean Smith Center was set in a 20-point loss against Duke in 1999.  Kentucky, with 17 points, and NC State, with 18 points, nearly broke Duke's record, before Wake Forest succeeded with 22 points; Duke then reclaimed the record with a 29-point victory.

At the time, the away game at Cole Field House was the worst defeat in 79 years against Maryland, and the most points an opponent scored over the Tar Heels.  The defeat also nearly matched the Tar Heels' worst defeat in their history with the Atlantic Coast Conference.

The home loss against NC State was also the worst home defeat to the Wolfpack since Dean Smith's first year as coach in 1962.

The Tar Heels matched their record for most losses in a season (15 losses in the 1950–51 and 1951-52 seasons) after their loss to Maryland at home.  They would end the season with 20 losses, the most losses in the history of the program.

The Tar Heels ended their regular season at home with a 6-9 record, the worst home record in the history of the program.

In the 2002 ACC men's basketball tournament, the seventh-seeded Tar Heels were defeated by second-seeded Duke, who would go on to win that year's tournament.

|-
!colspan=12 style="background:#56A0D3; color:#FFFFFF;"| ACC Tournament

References

North Carolina Tar Heels men's basketball seasons
North Carolina
2001 in sports in North Carolina
2002 in sports in North Carolina